The Telekom Cup (formerly known as T-Home Cup and LIGA total! Cup) is a German association football competition held since 2009.

The competition features four teams of the Bundesliga, playing two semi-finals and a final. Up until 2015, a match lasted 60 minutes, with each half 30 minutes long. The tournament would be over two days, with two games in each day. In 2015 the rules changed, where there would only be one 45 minute period, and all four matches take place in the same day. The event took place in Gelsenkirchen in 2009 and 2010, Mainz in 2011, Hamburg in 2012, Mönchengladbach in 2013, again in Hamburg for the 2014 edition, and again in Mönchengladbach in 2015. It was announced that non2016 tournament would be held.

The next tournament was held in January 2017, with the tournament taking place in Düsseldorf. The tournament was held next in July 2017, taking place in Mönchengladbach. Bayern Munich hold the most titles, with five. They are the only team to have participated in the first nine editions of the tournament.

After a break of two years due to the COVID-19 pandemic, a single-match edition of the tournament took place in 2022 in Cologne; it saw 1. FC Köln face A.C. Milan, the latter winning its first title.

Tournaments

2009 T-Home Cup

Bracket

Matches

2010 LIGA total! Cup

Bracket

Matches

2011 LIGA total! Cup

Bracket

Matches

2012 LIGA total! Cup

Bracket

Matches

2013 Telekom Cup

Bracket

Matches

2014 Telekom Cup

Description
On 24 April 2014, full details for the 2014 Telekom Cup were announced. It was confirmed Bayern Munich, Borussia Mönchengladbach, Hamburger SV and VfL Wolfsburg would participate in the sixth edition of the competition. It was also announced that the Imtech Arena would host the competition.

The opening semi-finals took place on 26 July, with the third place play-off and the final taking place on the following day. Matches last 30 minutes per half, rather than the usual 45. In case of a draw after 60 minutes, the match would go directly into a penalty shoot-out.

Tickets for the competition were released on 16 July.

Bracket

Matches

2015 Telekom Cup

Description
On 30 March 2015, it was confirmed that Bayern Munich, Borussia Mönchengladbach and Hamburger SV would participate, with a fourth team to be announced. The seventh edition will be held on 12 July 2015 at the Stadion im Borussia-Park. All games will be played in one day with less playing time. The fourth team to compete was decided later to be FC Augsburg. The rules changed for 2015, where a match will only last for 45 minutes instead of 60.

Bracket

Matches

2017 Telekom Cup (January)

2017 Telekom Cup (July)

2019 Telekom Cup

2022 Telekom Cup

Results by year

Statistics

Performance by team

Top goalscorers

References

External links

Football cup competitions in Germany
2009 establishments in Germany
Recurring sporting events established in 2009
German football friendly trophies